7744 is the natural number following 7743 and preceding 7745.

In mathematics
7744 is:
the square of 88, and is the smallest nonzero square each of whose decimal digits occur exactly twice.
the sum of two fifth powers: 7744 = 65 + (−2)5.
a Harshad number in bases 5, 9, 10, 12, 14 and 15.
the aliquot sum of both 10316 and 15482.
part of the 29-aliquot tree.

The complete aliquot sequence starting  at 7716 is: 7716, 10316, 7744, 9147, 3053, 115, 29, 1, 0

References

Integers